Chizhgora is a rural locality (a village) in Mezensky District, Arkhangelsk Oblast, Russia. The population was 151 as of 2010. There are 4 streets.

Geography 
Chizhgora is located on the Sova River, 97 km south of Mezen (the district's administrative centre) by road.

References 

Rural localities in Mezensky District
Pinezhsky Uyezd